The  is a  museum located in Arita town, Saga Prefecture, Japan. It is one of Japan's many museums which are supported by a prefecture.

The museum was built to contribute to the local cultural heritage, and the development of ceramics and pottery culture throughout Kyūshū, southern Japan. A valuable and extensive exhibition of work such as the famous Kanbara Collection of old Imari from Europe of the 17th to 18th centuries, as well as the Shibata Collection covering Arita pottery manufactured from 1603 to 1867.

See also
 Ceramics museum
 Fukuoka Oriental Ceramics Museum
 Prefectural museum

References

External links 

Museums with year of establishment missing
Ceramics museums in Japan
Museums in Saga Prefecture
Prefectural museums